The Reggae Sunjam Festival is an annual two-day event in Cyprus organized since 2016 by an independent group of reggae enthusiasts. It is held in the first half of August every year and features international and local artists (bands, selectors, dj's and live acts). It is the biggest reggae gathering in Cyprus.

In these first three years of its existence, the festival hosted artists from United Kingdom, Greece, Netherlands, Germany and of course Cyprus.

The festival is a way to bring all the reggae lovers of the island together, especially in a divided island. Greek Cypriots and Turkish Cypriots meet together under the sun and united they send their own message of love and peace.

Events

References

See also 

 List of reggae festivals
 Reggae

Reggae festivals